Prince Abdul Majeed bin Abdulaziz Domestic Airport  is located  southeast of AlUla, Saudi Arabia. It was named after Prince Abdul Majeed bin Abdulaziz. The airport was established on 31 October 2011.

The planned capacity of the airport was 100,000 passengers per year, particularly both tourists and locals. The airport began operations on 31 October 2011 when the first flight from Riyadh operated by Saudia. It is the closest airport to the pre-Islamic archaeological site of Mada'in Saleh and Al-'Ula Heritage Village. The airport is the first one in Saudi Arabia specifically designed to serve people coming to the region for visiting purposes.

In March 2021, the General Authority of Civil Aviation in Saudi Arabia has approved the landing of international flights at the airport. According to Saudi Press Agency, the airport's annual capacity has increased from 100,000 passengers to 400,000 and its area has increased to 2.4 million square meters.

Airlines and destinations

See also 

 List of airports in Saudi Arabia
 King Fahad International Airport
 Al-'Ula

References

2011 establishments in Saudi Arabia
Airports established in 2011
Airports in Saudi Arabia